The 1902 Southern Intercollegiate Athletic Association football season was the college football games played by the member schools of the Southern Intercollegiate Athletic Association as part of the 1902 college football season. The season began on September 27.

Clemson claimed an SIAA title. Rufus Nalley died on November 29, 1902, with a smile on his face hearing of his alma mater's defeat of Auburn.

Season overview

Results and team statistics

Key

PPG = Average of points scored per game
PAG = Average of points allowed per game

Regular season

SIAA teams in bold.

Week One

Week Two

Week Three

Week Four

Week Five

Week Six

Week Seven

Week Eight

Week Nine

Week Ten

Week Eleven

All-Southern team

Walker Reynolds Tichenor's All-Southern  team:

References